Coiled-coil domain containing 124 is a protein that in humans is encoded by the CCDC124 gene.

References

Further reading